St Kilda Cemetery is located in the Melbourne suburb of St Kilda East, Victoria.

History
St Kilda  Cemetery covers a large block bordered by Dandenong Road, Hotham Street, Alma Road and Alexandra Street. It is bounded by a historic wall and contains many Victorian era graves. The cemetery is the resting place of Alfred Deakin, the second Prime Minister of Australia, five Premiers of Victoria, and Albert Jacka VC, MC, barrister and Mayor of St Kilda (1930).

Notable interments

 David Andrade, anarchist
 Tilly Aston, founder of the Melbourne Braille Library
 Harold Breen, senior public servant
 Norman Brookes, tennis player
 Archibald Campbell, ornithologist
 Alfred Deakin, Prime Minister
 Michael Gudinski, Promoter
 Mary McKenzie Finlay, WWI matron
 Edmund FitzGibbon, planner, civil servant, pioneer of the Melbourne and Metropolitan Board of Works
 Caroline Hodgson, "Madame Brussels"
 Jessica Jacobs, actress
 Albert Jacka VC, soldier and councillor
 James Lorimer, shipping magnate, politician
 Christina Macpherson, composer
 Ferdinand von Mueller, botanist
 William Pitt, architect
 Premiers of Victoria
 William Haines
 Bryan O'Loghlen
 George Kerferd
 James Munro
 George Turner
 Hugh Ramsay, artist
 Robert Rede, Eureka Uprising identity, commissioner, sheriff
 Frederick Sargood, merchant and senator
 John Shillinglaw, historian
 Monckton Synnot, squatter, merchant
 Gyles Turner, historian

War graves
The cemetery contains the war graves of 20 Commonwealth service personnel, including 4 from World War I and 16 from World War II.

References

External links 
 St Kilda Cemetery (Southern Metropolitan Cemeteries Trust)
 Friends of St Kilda Cemetery
 St Kilda Cemetery – Billion Graves

1851 establishments in Australia
Cemeteries in Melbourne
St Kilda East, Victoria
Buildings and structures in the City of Port Phillip